Lithium ruthenate, Li2RuO3, is a chemical compound of lithium, ruthenium and oxygen. It has a layered honeycomb crystal structure, and can be prepared by direct calcination of Ru metal and lithium carbonate at ca. 700 °C. It is a potential lithium-ion battery electrode material, though this application is hindered by the high costs of Ru, as compared to the cheaper Li2MnO3 alternative.

References

Lithium compounds
Ruthenium(IV) compounds
Transition metal oxyanions